"Don't Make Me Go" is a song written and originally recorded by Johnny Cash.

The song was recorded by Cash in April 1957 and released as a single on Sun Records (Sun 266) later in the year, with "Next in Line" (another song from the same recording session) on the opposite side. The single reached #9 on the Billboard C&W Best Sellers in Stores chart.

Composition 
It is a melancholy love song, as is the song it was coupled with on the single.

References 

Johnny Cash songs
1957 singles
Songs written by Johnny Cash
Sun Records singles
1957 songs